Rainbow is a British children's television series, created by Pamela Lonsdale, which ran from  16 October 1972 until 6 March 1992 when Thames Television lost its ITV franchise to Carlton Television. The series was revived by HTV on 10 January 1994 until 24 March 1997, in two different formats from the original Thames series, with differing cast members.

The series was originally conceived as a British equivalent of long-running American educational puppet series Sesame Street. The British series was developed in house by Thames Television, and had no input from the Children's Television Workshop. It was intended to develop language and social skills for pre-school children and went on to win the Society of Film and Television Arts Award for Best Children's Programme in 1975. It aired five times weekly, twice weekly on Mondays and Wednesdays then Tuesdays and Fridays, and finally once weekly at 12:10 on Fridays on the ITV network.

The show had three producers over its lifetime – Pamela Lonsdale, Charles Warren and Joe Boyer.

The original Thames series has gained cult status and continues to get frequent mentions on radio and television. A few DVDs have been produced, including one celebrating 30 Years of Rainbow.

Premise
Each episode of Rainbow revolved around a particular activity or situation that arose in the Rainbow House, where the main characters lived. Some episodes, particularly in the early years, were purely educational in format and consisted of a series of scenes involving the characters learning about that particular episode's subject, interspersed with real-world footage, songs, stories and animations related to that same subject. The puppet characters of Zippy, George and Bungle would take the role of inquisitive children asking about the episode's subject, with the presenter (initially David Cook, and from 1974 onwards Geoffrey Hayes) serving the role of teacher figure, educating them about the subject. From the 1980s onwards, most episodes were more story-driven and frequently involved some kind of squabble or dispute between the puppet characters of Zippy, George and Bungle, and Geoffrey's attempts to calm them down and keep the peace.

The main story was interspersed with songs (most notably from Rod, Jane and Freddy, although the singers on the show changed several times during its run), animations, and stories read from the Rainbow storybook, usually by Geoffrey (or David, depending on the episode's air date). Some episodes focused on a particular topic, such as sounds or opposites, and consisted mainly of short sketches or exchanges between the main characters, rather than a consistent storyline. Brief sequences of animated line drawings, made by Cosgrove Hall Productions, were included in many episodes.

History

1972–1974

For the first two series of Rainbow, the show was presented by David Cook, who lived in the Rainbow House with Bungle the Bear, played by John Leeson. Each episode (most of which were written by John Kershaw) would focus on a particular educational subject, for instance, shapes, houses, or animals of some kind, and would involve Bungle inquisitively asking David about that subject, and David educating him about it. Real-world footage of the episode's subject would usually be shown, over which David and Bungle would comment. The character of Zippy (voiced by Peter Hawkins and operated by Violet Philpott), a tangerine oval-headed puppet with a zip for a mouth, would occasionally appear outside the window and provide most of the comedy, by adding his own input. As a 'know-it-all', Zippy would boast about his superior knowledge of the episode's subject, which would lead to humorous banter and squabbling between him and Bungle, who would occasionally zip up Zippy's mouth to stop him boasting. Each episode featured a song from the group Telltale about that episode's subject; Telltale also performed the show's theme tune which would be used for the entirety of its run. The scenes in the Rainbow House would also be interspersed with animations, as well as short sketches featuring the puppet characters of Sunshine and Moony (both operated and voiced by Violet Philpott), stories from the Rainbow book, usually read by a guest star, occasionally taking the form of stop-motion animations, and occasionally scenes involving different puppet characters. Most episodes ended with David showing the viewer how to make a particular item at home using paper or cardboard, again relating to that episode's theme.

Episode 18, 'Cats and Dogs' introduced an additional puppet character – Duffy the Dog, a white sheepdog who was friends with Zippy and would occasionally pop up at his side outside the window. Again, Duffy was both operated and voiced by Violet Philpott.

The second season of the show in 1973 brought in some notable changes – the character of Duffy was replaced by George the Hippo, a shy pink hippo friend of Zippy's who would crouch behind the window sill, only rarely coming into full view, and was so shy that he rarely spoke, preferring to make funny noises rather than speak. Zippy was now voiced by Roy Skelton, who also voiced George (albeit in a different, deeper-toned style from the later characteristic George voice), with Zippy now operated by John Thirtle and George by Valerie Heberden. Bungle's appearance was also changed significantly with a completely different head design, more like a teddy bear than the previous grizzly bear look. The show's title sequence was changed though the theme tune remained the same; the new title sequence was used for the rest of the show's run. Finally, at the end of Season Two, Sunshine and Moony were completely dropped from the series, in order to give George and Bungle more focus alongside Zippy.

1974–1981

The third season of the show saw several major cast changes, some of which would remain for the entirety of the show's run. David Cook was replaced as presenter by Geoffrey Hayes, with Stanley Bates replacing Leeson in the role of Bungle, whose appearance also saw several further changes over the ensuing years. The characters of Sunshine and Moony were dropped altogether. The singers also changed, with Telltale now replaced by the trio of Charlie Dore, Julian Littman and Karl Johnson. Halfway through the season, Ronnie Le Drew took over as Zippy's puppeteer.

In series 4 in 1974, the aforementioned singing trio were replaced by Rod Burton, Jane Tucker and Matthew Corbett, known as Rod, Matt & Jane. Matthew Corbett departed the show in 1976 to replace his father as the presenter of The Sooty Show, and was replaced by Roger Walker; the trio now known as Jane, Rod & Roger.

While the structure of the episodes remained generally the same as the early years, during this time the show's characters and format were developed significantly. Zippy became increasingly loud and boastful, his mischief a regular source of humour, while George became slightly more extroverted and was no longer afraid to speak, though his shyness remained a predominant character trait. Bungle also became increasingly 'goody-two-shoes' and showed a sneaky side, which put him frequently at odds with Zippy. Rather than just remaining outside the window, Zippy and George were shown within the Rainbow House itself more often, behind a table, while the singers would more frequently join the characters in the Rainbow House scenes rather than being confined to the song segment.

In 1976, Pamela Lonsdale was replaced by Charles Warren as the show's producer. John Kershaw remained the prime scriptwriter of the show during this era.

1981–1988

In 1981, Roger Walker was replaced by Freddy Marks as the third member of the singing trio, and Rod, Jane and Freddy were to become the show's best-remembered group of singers, eventually given their own spin-off show and establishing an identity in their own right outside of Rainbow. Valerie Heberden was replaced around this time by Malcolm Lord as George's puppeteer.

The format of the show was significantly built upon during this era. The scripts began to move beyond the educational format of the show and focus more on actual storylines, driven by character comedy rather than educational themes. The puppets were portrayed more like actual children, albeit exaggerated for comedy effect, with Zippy the loud and mischievous one, Bungle the tell-tale conformist, and George the shy, timid character caught between them. Geoffrey's character moved beyond the simple role of presenter to be more of a realistic parent figure, often becoming exasperated and harried by the antics of the three puppets, occasionally showing a grumpy side or losing his temper. As the show moved increasingly into sitcom territory, Rod, Jane & Freddy's roles increased vastly, involved more heavily in the storylines instead of just singing the song. More of the Rainbow House was shown instead of just the living room, with the bedrooms, kitchen, garden and occasionally additional rooms shown frequently. As the show increased in popularity, more celebrity guests began to feature, usually to read a story from the Rainbow book or help with the song. Another common theme for episodes around this time involved the cast acting out a well-known fairytale, such as Rumplestiltskin, The Ugly Duckling, or The Hare and the Tortoise. Various guest characters were introduced who would make the occasional recurring appearances, most notably 'Aunty' played by Patsy Rowlands, and Zippy's cousin Zippo (voiced by Roy Skelton and usually operated by Valerie Heberden).

At this time, more of the episodes were written by the cast members themselves, with Roy Skelton, Stanley Bates, Geoffrey Hayes and Freddy Marks all contributing a significant number of episodes to the show. A special 1,000th episode was screened in October 1986 around the time the show celebrated its 14th birthday, featuring a whole load of child viewers of the show joining the cast for a party, with Matthew Corbett and Sooty appearing as guest characters, alongside Christopher Lillicrap.

1989–1992

Series 21, in 1989, saw some major cast changes. Rod, Jane & Freddy left the show to concentrate on their own TV series and their touring. Rather than replace them, most episodes ditched the song feature altogether and the episodes became increasingly storyline-driven. Stanley Bates also left the show at this time although he continued to contribute as a scriptwriter, with George's puppeteer Malcolm Lord replacing him in the role of Bungle. George was now operated by Tony Holtham.

With the show's popularity among children continually proving enduring, and the show having attained a cult following among adults and students, its popularity was capitalized on in the form of a stage show, with the 'Rainbow Roadshow' touring throughout 1989, and a weekly Rainbow comic published by London Editions, which would occasionally itself be featured in the show. Items of Rainbow merchandise, such as toys and storybooks, were also produced frequently by this time.

For Series 22 in 1990, a new character was introduced in the form of Dawn, the next-door neighbour, played by Dawn Bowden, who stepped into Jane's role as the show's regular female character. Several episodes in this series also brought back the song feature, with the songs provided either by Dawn on her Casio keyboard or by Christopher Lillicrap on his guitar. The main cast members would usually join in on the songs themselves. Other frequent guest stars at this time were stage magician John Styles, who would entertain the cast by performing stories about Marzipan the Magician using his own magic tricks, and Gabrielle Bradshaw, who would show the cast how to make special items from paper and cardboard.

Although the show remained extremely popular with both children and adults, it finally came to an end in 1992 when Thames Television lost the London weekday ITV franchise to Carlton Television. Despite this, the cast continued to make frequent TV appearances throughout 1993, guesting on numerous talk shows as well as promoting the release of the "Raynboe" dance single by Eurobop (a mix of the theme tune set to a techno dance beat) and launching a newspaper campaign for the show to be brought back on air.

1994–1995

Following the nationwide newspaper campaign to bring Rainbow back on air, a reboot of the show was announced by Tetra Films in late 1993 and debuted on Children's ITV in on 10 January 1994. The reboot of the show reworked the format enormously as well as replacing nearly all of the cast members. Geoffrey's presenter role was scrapped altogether and the show instead focused on the characters of Zippy, George and Bungle, now independent of Geoffrey, running a toy shop for an unseen boss called Mr Top. Bungle's appearance was changed radically and he was now played by Richard Robinson, and in the absence of a presenter figure, served a kind of parent role towards Zippy and George whilst retaining his blundering, clumsy nature. Zippy and George's puppets were redesigned more subtly but Roy Skelton no longer voiced them; their voices now provided by their puppeteers – Ronnie Le Drew, the only member of the original show's cast still on board, voiced and operated Zippy, while George was operated and voiced by Craig Crane. Their personalities were also altered slightly, with George no longer shy but instead confident and assertive, with Zippy consequently forced into more of a self-pitying, submissive role although retaining his boastful nature. An additional puppet character was also introduced in the form of Cleo, a blue female rabbit voiced and operated by Gillian Robic. Cleo's role was unclear, with some episodes portraying her as a mere customer to the shop, others as a nosy neighbour and others as a playmate for Zippy and George. The theme tune and the opening sequence was changed altogether. The new format was not well received at all by either children or adults, and the show received overwhelmingly negative reviews in the newspapers; its lack of popularity was reflected in poor viewing figures.

Geoffrey Hayes said that he heard the news of his 'sacking' from the tabloids, rather than from Tetra: "I was shocked really, and for a couple of days I thought it was just me who had been dropped. But then Rod, Jane and Freddy had already left and of course, Roy had now been dropped too.  The guy playing Bungle – he was history, as was the puppeteer doing George; only Zippy's puppeteer was left. Ronnie Le Drew who also voiced Zippy for the new Tetra series; I discovered later, had auditioned for it. Bungle looked different too, though Zippy and George looked much the same".

1996–1997

After the poor reception to the first reboot, Tetra Films attempted a second reboot in 1996 in association with HTV, reworking the format again into a form closer to that of the original series. Now titled Rainbow Days, the new show ditched the toy shop setting and brought the characters back into a house environment, and reintroduced the role of the presenter, with Dale Superville now presenting the show. The character of Cleo was scrapped entirely, and Bungle's role was now played by Paul Cullinan. Rainbow Days re-embraced the 'variety show' format of the original series, generally focusing on an educational subject and consisting of scenes with Dale educating the puppet characters about the episode's subject, interspersed with comedic exchanges between Zippy and George in a similar style to the 'Sunshine and Moony' sketches from the earliest seasons, and songs performed by the whole cast, led by Dale. Bungle's character was now portrayed as a pure bumbling oaf, the butt of Zippy and George's jokes. Although Rainbow Days was better received than the previous reboot and popular enough to spawn a short-lived comic series, viewer ratings failed to match those of the original series and the show was cancelled after just one season of 13 episodes.

Mole in the Hole

In 1996, GMTV ordered a 26-part series, Mole in the Hole, for its weekend morning children's strand. Produced by AMG Productions, a division of the Artist Management Group, the GMTV series was essentially Geoffrey Hayes, Roy Skelton and Malcolm Lord's own attempt to reboot Rainbow, having been left out of the Tetra Films revivals. Set in the fictional village of Codswallop, Mole in the Hole featured Geoffrey Hayes as lead presenter, living in a country cottage with three puppet characters – a large mole called Norman (played by Malcolm Lord in a bodysuit), a dog called Freddie and a cat called Fifi (both voiced by Roy Skelton). Respectively, these characters had strongly similar voices and personalities to Bungle, Zippy and George. While the format was strikingly similar to that of Rainbow, the puppet characters had more independence of Geoffrey, such as driving out in the countryside by themselves and had more mature knowledge, including knowledge of Shakespeare's plays. Most episodes would end with the cast performing a song together. The series lasted for one season of 26 episodes. Following its GMTV transmission, the series was repeated as part of the Tiny Living block on LivingTV.

The Rainbow Disco Roadshow

In the early 2000s, Rainbow saw a revival of sorts among the student disco circuit, after a huge amount of Rainbow merchandise began to appear in shops and proved extremely popular with students who had grown up with the original TV series. The cast of Geoffrey Hayes, Roy Skelton, Malcolm Lord and Ronnie Le Drew reunited for the Rainbow Disco Roadshow, which would go on to tour university campuses and student discos for the bulk of the 00s. The shows consisted of Zippy assuming the role of 'Superstar DJ' and a stage show in which Geoffrey would invite members of the audience onstage to participate in a quiz with the characters of Zippy, Bungle and George, before joining students on the dancefloor.

The Rainbow Disco Roadshow proved popular on the student disco circuit throughout the 00s, and spawned another dance version of the Rainbow theme tune to be released as a single in 2002, titled "It's A Rainbow". During the 00s, the characters made guest appearances on numerous TV and radio shows, while Zippy featured in a popular Marmite TV commercial, a series of Rainbow DVDs were released, and Zippy and George made a guest appearance in the TV police drama series Ashes to Ashes. While there were reportedly numerous pitches for a new Rainbow TV series tailored to a student audience, none of these came to fruition.

In 2008, Zippy, George and Bungle returned to the stage with the Rainbow Live theatre show, which toured theatres throughout the UK. Written and presented by Mike Newman, who stepped into Geoffrey's role as presenter, the stage show featured the storyline of Zippy becoming a Superstar DJ and leaving the Rainbow House to tour the world but missing his old friends back at the Rainbow House. The show brought the characters to a new generation of children as well as attracting adults who grew up with the original series.

Although Roy Skelton and Geoffrey Hayes died in 2011 and 2018 respectively, the characters of Zippy, George and Bungle still make the occasional TV appearances to the present day.

Theme song
The theme song for the show was actually a small part of the full version, also called "Rainbow" and written by Hugh Portnow, Lady Hornsbrie, Hugh Fraser and Tim Thomas of the band Telltale, who regularly appeared in the first two seasons of the show. It was released as a single on an offshoot of the Music for Pleasure label called Surprise, Surprise in 1973 with the B-side "Windy Day". Although Telltale left the show in 1974, their recording of the theme tune continued to be used until the end of the original show's run in 1992.

There have been several dance versions of the theme tune which have been released as singles. The dance act Solo had a minor hit in 1991 with a sample-free instrumental version of the Rainbow theme, while Eurobop released a dance version in 1993 featuring samples taken directly from the original theme as well as voice samples of the main characters, who appeared on several music TV shows to promote the single; a hardcore version entitled "Rainbow Vibes" by the Sonz of Bungle circulated on 12" vinyl in 1992 which sampled the theme tune over a chopped up breakbeat and featuring rave stabs. The most recent dance version, titled "It's a Rainbow!" and featuring the vocals of Zippy and George, reached the UK top 20 in 2002.

In 2019 Matt Berry produced a version of Rainbow included on an album recreating some 70s and 80s TV theme tunes, called Television Themes.

Episode list

Characters

Rainbow featured the following characters, each with their own character style:

The presenter – at first David Cook, who was replaced in 1974 by the best-known presenter Geoffrey Hayes. He brought the other members of the Rainbow household to order or gave them something to do. He acted as the symbol of adult wisdom, and rarely demonstrated overt affection to any of the three puppet characters, acting more as a carer/teacher than a father. While bright and cheery by default, Geoffrey occasionally became exasperated and flustered by the misbehaviour of the puppet characters, and a lot of the comedy in the later episodes revolved around him showing a grumpier side and occasionally losing his temper. There were infrequent mentions to his life outside of the Rainbow household, such as girlfriends, while several episodes stated that Geoffrey had a day job, apparently working in an office during weekdays.
Zippy – loud and domineering, but usually very funny (albeit not to the other characters in the show). The puppet was originally voiced by Peter Hawkins and operated by Violet Philpott and later voiced by Roy Skelton and Ronnie Le Drew – Philpott and Skelton were voice artists also well known for voicing Daleks and Cybermen in Doctor Who – and since 1973 operated by Ronnie Le Drew who later voiced him after Skelton. Zippy's mouth is a zip, and when he became too bossy or irritating, this was zipped shut to prevent him from continuing: on at least one occasion he unzipped himself, though he appears unable to do so on other occasions or simply submits to this punishment. He broadly represented childhood self-centeredness, "naughtiness" and extroversion. Zippy was extremely boastful and would frequently brag about his superior intelligence and singing skill (both of which proved to be completely unfounded when put to the test) and was also greedy, often overeating and displaying a particular love for chocolate and sweets.
George – a shy, pink and slightly camp hippo. He broadly represented sensitivity and introversion. (puppet; voiced by Roy Skelton and operated by Malcolm Lord, Tony Holtham and later Craig Crane).  George first appeared in 1973, introduced as a shy friend of Zippy's who was afraid of being seen or heard, usually crouching very low behind the window pane and rarely speaking, preferring to make funny noises. In subsequent seasons George gradually became more extroverted and spoke more, though he remained predominantly shy and timid. The most generally well-behaved and well-meaning of the puppet characters, George often found himself caught between Zippy and Bungle's squabbling, and his good nature taken advantage of by the other characters. Although mostly introverted, several episodes reveal that he aspires to be a singer.
Bungle – a brown furry bear with a squashed face, who is inquisitive but also clumsy and usually complains a lot about the other characters, especially Zippy's antics. He broadly represented conformity. Although on the surface he appears well-behaved and sensible, Bungle has a very sneaky side and a tendency to suck up to authority, making him frequently just as troublesome as Zippy, if not more so. The polar opposites of Zippy and Bungle's personalities are the source of much humour. Unlike Zippy and George, Bungle is a costume rather than a puppet; played by John Leeson, Anthony Pitt, Stanley Bates and Malcolm Lord in the Thames TV series and by Richard Robinson and Paul Cullinan in the reboot. The stunt double in the late 90s was Stuart Nichol. Although unclothed most of the time, he wraps a towel around his waist after a shower and also wears tartan pyjamas at bedtime. His friends would on occasion put his bed in the shower if he was not vigilant. The original 1972 costume resembled a wild brown bear, but in 1973 this was replaced with a new design resembling a teddy bear. The costume design underwent another overhaul upon Bates assuming the role in 1974 with an all brown pelt (instead of the previous brown/white) slimmer torso and further modified face.
Rod, Jane and Freddy – a group of musicians who regularly featured on the show. When they debuted in 1974 they were 'Rod, Jane and Matt', Matt being Matthew Corbett (of The Sooty Show fame). Matt was replaced from 1977 by Roger Walker, before Freddy Marks, in turn, took over in 1981. Although initially confined to the song segment of the show, gradually Rod, Jane & Freddy began to feature more heavily in the episode's storylines during the show's run, often playing significant roles in the plot. Some of the early 80s episodes stated they lived in the Rainbow House and they were shown to have a bedroom of their own, although later episodes implied they lived next door. Rod, Jane & Freddy were very well-respected and looked up to by Zippy, George and Bungle, who admired their singing and rarely ever got into any conflict with them.
Sunshine and Moony – optimistic sunshine (yellow with a red hat) and his more gloomy friend Moony (brown with a tuft of yellow hair) were the original 'stars' of the programme, but soon became little more than foils to the more popular Zippy. They would occupy short sketches in the early episodes, the humour coming from the boastful, extroverted Sunshine winding up the more modest, cynical Moony, in a loose parallel of the later relationship between Zippy and George. they were phased out by 1974, in favour of greater roles for Bungle and (especially) George. They were voiced by Violet Yeomans.
Telltale – a six-piece group who provided the music in the early days of the show. They were a folk-rock band and their repertoire would consist of both original compositions and cover versions.
 Charlie Dore, Julian Littman and Karl Johnson – the singing trio who replaced Telltale in 1974. They stayed with the show before being replaced by Rod, Matt & Jane in 1975. Charlie Dore and Julian Littman went on to have hugely successful music careers, while Karl Johnson became a well-known actor.
Duffy – a white sheepdog. Zippy's short-lived original sidekick for a handful of episodes circa 1972. Replaced by George in the 1973 series.
Zippo – Zippy's cousin, identical in appearance to Zippy but slightly brighter in colour, who would make the occasional guest appearance throughout the 80s and 90s seasons. Originally portrayed as an eloquent Frenchman, but a later episode depicted him as an American-accented rapper with loud, flashy clothing. Operated first by Valerie Heberden and later by Nigel Plaskitt, and voiced by Roy Skelton.
Georgette – a pink female hippo, identical in appearance to George except for her longer eyelashes and floppy hat. She appears in the 1986 episode "Falling Out and Making Up" in which she moves into the house next door to the Rainbow House and immediately gets along well with George. Despite her close resemblance to George in appearance and name, this appears to be nothing more than sheer coincidence.
Dawn – the next-door neighbour, played by Dawn Bowden, who was introduced in the show's later years, first appearing in 1990. Dawn would often pop round to the Rainbow House to help out with everyday chores and socialize with the characters, as well as performing songs with the rest of the cast on her Casio keyboard.
 Aunty – played by Patsy Rowlands, is apparently Geoffrey's aunt, who he used to stay with as a little boy. Aunty comes round to visit in several episodes, while in others the cast visit her. Aunty is a very old-fashioned woman, which occasionally exasperates the puppet characters, although they enjoy her company nonetheless.
 Christopher – played by Christopher Lillicrap, a semi-regular guest star who would guest on the show from time to time since the 70s, at first to read stories and later to perform songs, which the main cast would join in with.
 Vince – played by Vince Hill, a singer who would occasionally visit the Rainbow House and join in a song with Rod, Jane & Freddy. One episode portrayed him as a kind of 'Geoffrey' figure for Zippo when he showed up with Zippo to a garden party.

Generally speaking, George and Zippy represented two 'types' of a child, George being the quiet and shy type, while Zippy represented the hyperactive and destructive type. Zippy often demonstrated a cynicism and wit that went beyond the "4th wall" and appealed to older viewers. George was usually vindicated, and Zippy got his comeuppance. While they were apparently young 'children' (aged around 6), Bungle was an older 'child' (aged around 8), and differed from them in being a costume rather than a hand puppet. Geoffrey's relationship to them was unclear, other than being a kind of mentor/teacher/carer.

The "adult" version

In 1979, the cast and crew of Rainbow made a special exclusive sketch for the Thames TV staff Christmas tape, sometimes referred to as the "Twangers" episode. This sketch featured plenty of deliberate sexual innuendo (beginning with Zippy peeling a banana, saying 'One skin, two skin, three skin...' before being interrupted by George), and was never shown at the time (as it was never intended to be screened to the general public.) The cast later sang "The Plucking Song".

The clip became famous after being aired on Victor Lewis-Smith's Channel 4 programme TV Offal (1997) and was referred to as 'the pilot episode' in order to fit into the regular programme segment "The Pilots That Crashed"; however, the clip clearly was not a pilot, as Geoffrey Hayes was not a regular presenter until the series itself was a year old. The clip became widespread with the increasing popularity of the Internet, first as an e-mail attachment and later via online video websites such as YouTube. This has led to many erroneous claims that the episode was publicly broadcast as a regular episode.

TV Offal also broadcast some very risqué material featuring Hayes, Zippy and George as guests on a variety programme hosted by comedian Jim Davidson in the 1980s; the sketch in question featured former children's TV presenter Tommy Boyd asking a question about Adam and Eve. Boyd and Davidson used some profanities in the sketch, along with some innuendo from George (presumably again not intended for broadcast like the above), and Zippy exclaimed to Geoffrey an expletive phrase quite out of character from his children's television persona. (Incidentally, the said footage appeared uncut on Thames Television's 1984 Christmas tape.)

VHS releases
Video Collection International (1986–1996)
FremantleMedia (2002–2018)

Rainbow (1972–1992) VHS releases

Rainbow (1994–1995) VHS releases

Reruns
Episodes of the original Rainbow, dating from the early 1980s, were shown sporadically on the UK satellite TV channel Nick Jr. (and/or its sister channel, Nick Jr. 2) in the late 2000s as part of its Nick Jr. Classics reruns. A previous repeat run took place on UK Gold (now Gold) from its launch in November 1992 to 1994; these were mostly from the last three years of the programme (without Rod, Jane and Freddy).

Further reading
 Mike Anderiesz, Climbing High: Life Under the Rainbow Exposed (Boxtree, 2002).
 Tim Randall, Rainbow Unzipped – The Autobiography Published on 1 October 2009 by Headline Publishing Group.
 The A to Z of Classic Children's Television by Simon Sheridan. (Reynolds & Hearn books, 2004, reprinted 2007). This book features a chapter on the series and interviews with Jane Tucker and Pamela Lonsdale.
 Zippy and Me: My Life Inside Britain’s Most Infamous Puppet by Ronnie LeDrew, Unbound (2019)

Sweet Cherry Publishing 
An initial range of three hand puppet books featuring Bungle, Zippy and George was launched at the London Book Fair on 12 March on Sweet Cherry's stand, and then at the Bologna Book Fair on 1 April. These books were going to be available at retail from July–October 2019, but it was delayed further until May 2020.

 I Love You, Bungle! (Sweet Cherry Publishing, 28 May 2020)
 Time For Bed, Zippy! (Sweet Cherry Publishing, 28 May 2020)
 Let's Play, George! (Sweet Cherry Publishing, 28 May 2020)

References

External links

 
 Rights owner's Rainbow sales page
 Official Rainbow YouTube Channel
 Transcript of the adult version
 Zippy's Big Red Twanger
 British Film Institute Screen Online
 Rainbow Facebook Fan Page
 BBC News, 28 February 2006.
 Zippy and George starred on The One Show, 9 October 2009.
 Zippy, George and Bungle appeared in the Pizza Hut advert, 3 October 2017.

1972 British television series debuts
1992 British television series endings
1970s British children's television series
1980s British children's television series
1990s British children's television series
British children's television series
ITV children's television shows
British preschool education television series
British television shows featuring puppetry
British television series with live action and animation
1970s preschool education television series
1980s preschool education television series
1990s preschool education television series
Television series by FremantleMedia Kids & Family
Television shows produced by Thames Television
Television shows produced by Harlech Television (HTV)
English-language television shows
Television shows set in England
Television shows shot at Teddington Studios